Steven H. Low is a Professor of the Computing and Mathematical Sciences Department and the Electrical Engineering Department at the California Institute of Technology.   He is known for his work on the theory and mathematical modeling of Internet congestion control, algorithms, and optimization in power systems.

Academic biography
Low received his BS in electrical engineering from Cornell University in 1987, and PhD in electrical engineering from the University of California, Berkeley under the supervision of Pravin Varaiya in 1992.  He was with AT&T Bell Labs in Murray Hill, NJ, from 1992 to 1996, the University of Melbourne, Australia, from 1996 to 2000, and joined Caltech in 2000.

Research
Low pioneered a mathematical theory of large-scale networks under end-to-end congestion control such as the Internet, with implications on resource allocation, routing, and network architecture. He and his research team designed a new congestion control algorithm called FAST TCP based on this mathematical theory, built a unique testbed WAN-in-Lab and worked with high-energy physicists (HEP) at Caltech, CERN and around the
world to break world records on data transfer.  His work is instrumental in changing the focus of congestion control research and land speed record contests from parameter tuning to algorithm design and analysis.

Through a startup called FastSoft, his team actively pursued the deployment of their research which has been accelerating the world's largest content distribution and social networks as well as other Fortune 500 companies.

Upon returning to Caltech after Fastsoft, his research began to focus on the control and optimization of distributed energy resources for future smart grids.

Awards and honors

Low is an IEEE Fellow, a co-recipient of an R&D 100 Award, and IEEE prize papers awards. He has been a Chair/Honorary/Guest/Adjunct Professor with Zhejiang University, China, National Taipei University of Technology, Taiwan, Shanghai Jiaotong University, China, and Swinburne University of Technology, Australia.

References

Living people
California Institute of Technology faculty
Fellow Members of the IEEE
American computer scientists
Cornell University alumni
University of California, Berkeley alumni
Year of birth missing (living people)